The women's long jump at the 2022 World Athletics Championships was held at the Hayward Field in Eugene on 23 and 24 July 2022.

Records
Before the competition records were as follows:

Qualification standard
The standard to qualify automatically for entry was 6.82 m.

Schedule
The event schedule, in local time (UTC−7), was as follows:

Results

Qualification 
The qualification round took place on 23 July, in two groups, both starting at 12:00. Athletes attaining a mark of at least 6.75 metres ( Q ) or at least the 12 best performers ( q ) qualified for the final.

Final 
The final was started on 24 July at 17:50.

References

Long jump
Long jump at the World Athletics Championships